The 1935 Ottawa Rough Riders finished in 3rd place in the Interprovincial Rugby Football Union with a 5–4 record, but failed to qualify for the playoffs.

Regular season

Standings

Schedule

References

Ottawa Rough Riders seasons